Maravi was a kingdom which straddled the current borders of Malawi, Mozambique, and Zambia, in the 16th century. The present-day name "Maláŵi" is said to derive from the Chewa word "malaŵí", which means "flames".

History

At its greatest extent, the state included territory from the Tonga and Tumbuka people's areas in the north to the Lower Shire in the south, and as far west as the Luangwa and Zambezi river valleys. Maravi's rulers belonged to the Mwale matriclan and held the title Kalonga. They ruled from Manthimba, the secular/administrative capital, and were the driving force behind the state's establishment. Meanwhile, the patrilineal Banda clan, which traditionally provided healers, sages and metallurgists, took care of religious affairs from their capital Mankhamba near Nthakataka.

After contact with the Portuguese, trade intensified. It included such items as beads of the Khami type and Chinese porcelain imported via Portuguese intermediaries. In the 19th century, the state declined and the Maravi were frequently raided by their neighbours the Yao and captured for sale as slaves.  David Livingstone visited Lake Nyasa in 1859, and other Protestant missionaries soon followed.

The Maravi Confederacy was founded by the Bantu people immigrating into the valley of the Shire River (flowing out of Lake Nyassa) around 1480 AD. It prospered into the late 18th century, extending to reach what is now belonging to Zambia and Mozambique. In the 19th century the neighboring Yao raided on them, selling captive Maravi on the slave markets of Kilwa and Zanzibar. In the 1860s, Islam was introduced into the region through contact with Swahili slave traders. The region was visited by David Livingstone and stations were set up by Protestant missionaries in 1873. A British consul was also sent there in 1883.

Beginning as early as the thirteenth century, the first signs of a large-scale migration of related clans entered the region of Lake Malawi. Traditional accounts indicate that these people originated in the Congo Basin to the west of Lake Mweru, in an area that subsequently formed part of the Luba Kingdom. The movement continued during the succeeding two or three centuries, but it appears certain that by the sixteenth century the main body of these people, known collectively as the Maravi, were settled in the Shire River valley and over a wide area lying generally west and southwest of Lake Malawi, including parts of present-day Zambia and Mozambique. The first (colonial) historical account of the Maravi was by Gaspar Bocarro, a Portuguese man who traveled through their territory in 1616. The picture presented in the 1660s by Father Manuel Barretto, a Jesuit priest, was of a strong, economically active confederation that swept an area from the coast of Mozambique between the Zambezi River and the bay of Quelimane for several hundred kilometres into the mainland. An account from the following century implied that the western limits of the confederation were near the Luangwa River and that it extended on the north to the Dwangwa River.

"Maravi" is therefore a general name of the peoples of Malawi, Zambia, Mozambique and the eastern part of Zimbabwe. The Chewa language, which is also referred to as Nyanja, Chinyanja or Chichewa, and is spoken in southern and central Malawi, in Zambia and to some extent in Mozambique, is the main language that emerged from this empire.

References

External links
Maravi culture
History of Maravi

Former countries in Africa
History of Malawi
States and territories established in the 16th century
16th century in Africa
Former countries